Cerocahui is a town in the Urique Municipality of Chihuahua, Mexico.

History 
Cerocahui was founded by a Jesuit missionary in 1680.

It is well known for its local Jesuit church. In June 2022 gunmen invaded the church after a local man tried to seek refuge inside the building. The assailants murdered a civilian man as well as two Jesuit priests.

References 

Populated places in Chihuahua (state)
1680 establishments in the Spanish Empire
1680s in Mexico
17th-century establishments in Mexico
Populated places established in 1680